Lake Lancaster Abajo, together with Lake Lancaster Arriba are part of two lakes in the Limón province of Costa Rica, collectively referred as the Lancaster Lakes.

Location 

The Lancaster lakes are located in a private property next to Reventazón River, and 7.35 kilometers SW of the Reventazón Dam. Lancaster Abajo is located at 100 m lower elevation and to the south of Lancaster Arriba.

Physical aspects 

Lake Lancaster Abajo is of landslide origin, it possesses cool stream water inputs and is probably stratified through the year due to its relative depth.

Conservation area 

The Bonilla-Bonillita Lacustrine Wetland created in 1994 is composed by this lake and Lake Lancaster Arriba, Lake Bonilla and Lake Bonillita and their surrounding areas.

See also 
 List of lakes in Costa Rica

References 

Geography of Limón Province
Tourist attractions in Limón Province
Lancaster Abajo